Beach Township is a township in Golden Valley County, North Dakota. Its population was 157 as of the 2010 census, down from 189 in 2000.

Geography 

The township of Beach is located on the western border of the county and the state. It surrounds the city of Beach and borders the following other townships in Golden Valley County:
 Saddle Butte – north
 Delhi – north
 Sentinel – east
 Garner – southeast corner
 Lone Tree – south

References

Townships in Golden Valley County, North Dakota
Townships in North Dakota